The 1999 Warsaw Cup by Heros was a tennis tournament played on outdoor clay courts in Warsaw, Poland that was part of Tier IVb of the 1999 WTA Tour. The tournament was held from 3 May until 9 May 1999. Cristina Torrens Valero won the singles title.

Entrants

Seeds

Other entrants
The following players received wildcards into the singles main draws:
  Karolina Jagieniak
  Jelena Dokić

The following players received entry from the singles qualifying draw:

  Rosa María Andrés Rodríguez
  Irina Selyutina
  Tina Pisnik
  Inés Gorrochategui

The following players received entry from the doubles qualifying draw:

  Tina Pisnik /  Silvija Talaja

Finals

Singles

 Cristina Torrens Valero defeated  Inés Gorrochategui, 7–5, 7–6(7–3)
 It was Torrens Valero's first title of the year and her career, after having reached her first final a fortnight earlier.

Doubles

 Cătălina Cristea /  Irina Selyutina defeated  Amélie Cocheteux /  Janette Husárová, 6–1, 6–2

External links
WTA Profile

Warsaw
Warsaw Open
May 1999 sports events in Europe
War